Klishino is a rural locality in Bolsheugonsky Selsoviet Rural Settlement, Lgovsky District, Kursk Oblast, Russia. Population:

Geography 
The village is located on the Seym River, 46 km from the Russia–Ukraine border, 59 km south-west of Kursk, 7 km south-east of the district center – the town Lgov, 4 km from the selsoviet center – Bolshiye Ugony.

 Climate
Klishino has a warm-summer humid continental climate (Dfb in the Köppen climate classification).

Transport 
Klishino is located on the road of regional importance  (Kursk – Lgov – Rylsk – border with Ukraine) as part of the European route E38, 2 km from the road of intermunicipal significance  (38K-017 – Sugrovo – railway station Lgov). There is a railway halt 404 km (railway line Lgov I — Kursk).

The rural locality is situated 66 km from Kursk Vostochny Airport, 136 km from Belgorod International Airport and 269 km from Voronezh Peter the Great Airport.

References

Notes

Sources

Rural localities in Lgovsky District
Lgovsky Uyezd